Robert E. Schaefer, Sr. is a former American architect and politician from Idaho. Schaefer is a former Republican member of Idaho House of Representatives.

Early life 
On July 21, 1936, Schaefer was born as Robert Ernest Schaefer in Nampa, Idaho. Schaefer's father was Bill Schaefer and his mother was Mildred Schaefer. In 1954, Schaefer graduated from Nampa High School.

Education 
In 1967, Schaefer earned a Bachelor of Arts degree in Architecture from University of Idaho.

Career 
In 1957, Schaefer served in the United States Air Force, until 1961.

In 1978, Schaefer started an architect firm.

In 1979, Schaefer served as a member on the Nampa School Board, until 1980.

On November 5, 1996, Schaefer won the election unopposed and became a Republican member of Idaho House of Representatives for District 11, seat A. On November 3, 1998, as an incumbent, Schaefer won the election and continued serving District 11, seat A. Schaefer defeated Maureen O'Donnell with 68.6% of the votes. On November 7, 2000, as an incumbent, Schaefer won the election unopposed and continued serving District 11, seat A.votes.

On November 5, 2002, Schaefer won the election and became a Republican member of Idaho House of Representatives for District 12, seat A. Schaefer defeated Jay Riddle with 76.7% of the votes.
On November 2, 2004, as an incumbent, Schaefer won the election unopposed and continued serving District 12, seat A.
On November 7, 2006, November 4, 2008, and November 2, 2010, as an incumbent  Schaefer won the elections and continued serving District 12, seat A.

Personal life 
On September 12, 1965, Schaefer married Betty Seitz. They have two children.

On October 29, 2019, Schaefer died from prostate cancer in Nampa, Idaho.

References

External links 
 Robert Schaefer at ballotpedia.org
 Schaefer, Sr., Robert E. at ourcampaigns.com

Republican Party members of the Idaho House of Representatives
People from Nampa, Idaho
University of Idaho alumni
1936 births
2019 deaths